The 2012–13 SC Preußen Münster season is the 106th season in the club's football history.

Review and events

In 2012–13 the club plays in the 3. Liga, the third tier of German football. It is the club's second season in this league, having been promoted from the Regionalliga in 2011.

The club also took part in the 2012–13 edition of the DFB-Pokal, the German Cup, where it reached the second round and will face Bundesliga side FC Augsburg next. The club had knocked out Bundesliga club Werder Bremen in the first round with a 4–2 victory.

Preußen Münster also takes part in the 2012–13 edition of the Westphalia Cup, having reached the second round against DSC Wanne-Eickel after a 5–0 win over TuS Hiltrup in the first round. In the round of 16, they defeated FC Brünninghausen with 8–0 and progressed to the quarter-final where they won against Sportfreunde Lotte 3–0.

Matches

Legend

3. Liga

League fixtures and results

League table

Current league table

Results summary

DFB-Pokal

Westphalia Cup

Overall record

Squad and statistics

|-
! colspan="12" style="background:#dcdcdc; text-align:center"| Goalkeepers

|-
! colspan="12" style="background:#dcdcdc; text-align:center"| Defenders

|-
! colspan="12" style="background:#dcdcdc; text-align:center"| Midfielders

|-
! colspan="12" style="background:#dcdcdc; text-align:center"| Forwards

|-
! colspan="12" style="background:#dcdcdc; text-align:center"| Players no longer at the club

|}

Sources

Match reports

Other

External links
 2012–13 SC Preußen Münster season at Weltfussball.de 
 2012–13 SC Preußen Münster season at kicker.de 
 2012–13 SC Preußen Münster season at Fussballdaten.de 

Preussen Munster
SC Preußen Münster seasons